Visa requirements for Nigerian citizens are administrative entry restrictions imposed by the authorities of other states on citizens of Nigeria.

As of 2 July 2021, Nigerian citizens had visa-free or visa on arrival access to 45 countries and territories, ranking the Nigerian passport 98th in terms of travel freedom according to the Henley Passport Index.

Where visa-free access is permitted, such access is not necessarily a right, and admission is at the discretion of border enforcement officers. Visitors engaging in activities other than tourism, including unpaid work, may require a visa or work permit.

Visa requirements map

Visa requirements

Dependent, Disputed, or Restricted territories
Unrecognized or partially recognized countries

Dependent and autonomous territories

See also 

 Visa policy of Nigeria
 Nigerian passport

References and Notes
References

Notes

Nigeria
Government of Nigeria
Foreign relations of Nigeria